Going to Press is a 1942 Our Gang short comedy film directed by Edward Cahn. It was the 204th Our Gang short (205th episode, 116th talking short, 117th talking episode, and 36th MGM produced episode) that was released.

Plot
Determined to uncover the identity of the mysterious leader of a juvenile extortion racket, the gang sets up a crusading newspaper called The Greenpoint Press. The kids gratefully accept the help of a pleasant, well-spoken youngster named Frank, little suspecting that he is the duplicitous boss of the dreaded Gas House Gang. Only after Frank's henchmen have taken Froggy for a "ride" (a harmless but painful one) are the kids able to expose the villain and save the day.

Cast

The Gang
 Mickey Gubitosi as Mickey
 George McFarland as Spanky
 Billy Laughlin as Froggy
 Billie Thomas as Buckwheat
 Juanita Quigley as Sally
 Clyde Demback as Fatty

Additional cast
 Darryl Hickman as Frank
 Freddie Chapman as Gas House Kid
 Vincent Graeff as Gas House Kid
 James Gubitosi as Gas House Kid
 Tommy Tucker as Boy standing outside of barn

Notes
Juanita Quigley reprises her earlier guest character of "Sally" from 1940's The New Pupil though here Quigley is the female lead and a regular member of the gang — the only episode in the MGM era with someone other than Darla Hood or Janet Burston.

See also
 Our Gang filmography

References

External links
 

1942 films
1942 comedy films
American black-and-white films
Films directed by Edward L. Cahn
Metro-Goldwyn-Mayer short films
Our Gang films
1942 short films
Films about newspaper publishing
1940s American films